Governor Stanley may refer to:

Augustus Owsley Stanley (1867–1958), 38th Governor of Kentucky
Herbert Stanley (1872–1955), Governor of Northern Rhodesia from 1924 to 1927, of Ceylon from 1928 to 1931, and of Southern Rhodesia from 1935 to 1942
Robert Christopher Stafford Stanley (1899–1983), Governor of the Solomon Islands from 1953 to 1955
Thomas B. Stanley (1890–1970), 57th Governor of Virginia
William Eugene Stanley (1844–1910), 15th Governor of Kansas